There are 35 placenames and 1 district in Ukraine called Horodyshche. This widely popular placename stems from old Ukrainian word horod, which means a fortified town, settlement but also can mean a garden in modern Ukrainian, depending on the stress of the syllable.

Among these:

 Horodyshche - city in Cherkasy Oblast of central Ukraine, formerly the administrative center of Horodyshche Raion
 Horodyshche, Alchevsk Raion, Luhansk Oblast - urban-type settlement in Perevalsk Raion of Luhansk Oblast
 Horodyshche, Bilodovsk settlement hromada, Starobilsk Raion, Luhansk Oblast - village in Strobilsk Raion of Luhansk Oblast
 Horodyshche, Markivka settlement hromada, Starobilsk Raion, Luhansk Oblast - village in Strobilsk Raion of Luhansk Oblast
 Horodyshche, Kozova settlement hromada, Ternopil Raion, Ternopil Oblast - village in Ternopil Raion of Ternopil Oblast of western Ukraine
 Horodyshche, Ternopil urban hromada, Ternopil Raion, Ternopil Oblast - village in Ternopil Raion of Ternopil Oblast of western Ukraine
 Horodyshche, Kivertsi Raion - village in Kivertsi raion of Volyn Oblast in western Ukraine
 Horodyshche, Kovel Raion - village in Kovel Raion of Volyn Oblast in western Ukraine
 Horodyshche, Lutsk Raion - village in Lutsk Raion of Volyn Oblast
 Horodyshche, Lityn Raion - village in Lityn Raion of Vinnytsia Oblast, western Ukraine
 Horodyshche, Zhydachiv Raion - village in Stryi Raion of Lviv Oblast
 Horodyshche, Dubrovytsia Raion - village in Dubrovytsia Raion of Rivne Oblast
 Horodyshche is also former name of Hradyzk in Poltava Oblast, Ukraine
 Horodyshche (border checkpoint) - border checkpoint in Ukraine on the border with Belarus across from Verkhniy Trebezhov

See also
 Horodyszcze (disambiguation) (Ukrainian spelling written in Polish) - placenames in Poland (nearby Ukraine) with this name
 Grodziszcze (disambiguation) (proper Polish spelling) - related placenames in Poland
 Gorodishche, Russia - placenames in Russia with this name
 Haradzishcha - two placenames in Belarus with this name
 Horodişte (disambiguation) - four placenames in Moldova
 Hradiště (disambiguation) - placenames in Czech republic and Slovakia
 Grădiştea (disambiguation) (Romanian form) - placenames in Romania
 Gradište (disambiguation) - placenames in Serbia, Croatia and Macedonia